Saint-Gély-du-Fesc is a commune in the Hérault department, Occitania, southern France.

The origin of this city is from Saint Gilles, a Christian of the 8th century, and Fesc means « control post » in Occitan language.

In 2004, the city has decided to leave the Agglomeration community of Montpellier Agglomération.

Population

Personalities
Georges Brassens died in this city, in 1981.

Places and monuments 
 Archeological site of the "Vautes", of "Rouergas", and of the "Colline de l'Homme Mort" (dead men hill), who left traces from the neolithic. (4000 years B-C).
 Church of Saint-Gilles; on top of the steeple, the iron bell tower contains a bell classified "MH", dating from 1759.
 Coulondres-Philippe-Eldridge parc, an 18 hectares site where one can observe several Mediterranean species, as well as a botanical path.

See also
Communes of the Hérault department

References

Communes of Hérault